Kabash is a town in Kosovo.

Kabash may also refer to:

Kabash Mountain, a mountain in Kosovo
Kabashi, a tribe of northern Albania
Kabash, Elbasan, a village in the municipality of Gramsh, Elbasan County, Albania
Kabash, Korçë, a village in the municipality of Kolonjë, Korçë County, Albania
Kabash, Shkodër, a village in the municipality of Pukë, Shkodër County, Albania